Declan Ruth (born 30 April 1976) is an Irish hurling manager and former player. He is the current manager of his hometown club Rapparees, having enjoyed a lengthy career with them as a player, while he also lined out with the Wexford senior hurling team. Ruth usually lined out as a defender.

Playing career

Ruth first came to prominence at juvenile and underage levels as a dual player with the Shamrocks GAA club, before transferring to the Rapparees GAA club. He eventually progressed onto the club's top adult teams and won two County Championship titles as a Gaelic footballer. Ruth first appeared on the inter-county scene as a member of the Wexford minor team before later winning consecutive Leinster Under-21 Championship titles. He made his first appearance for the Wexford senior hurling team in an Oireachtas Cup game against Clare in November 1995. Ruth was a non-playing substitute on the Wexford team that beat Limerick in the 1996 All-Ireland final. He had earlier won a Leinster Championship medal as a non-playing substitute and, after being dropped from the team for a period, returned to win a second provincial title in 2004.

Managerial career

Ruth has been involved in coaching and team management at all levels with the Rapparees club. In 2021 he managed the club's senior team to a first County Championship title in 43 years.

Personal life

Ruth was educated at Enniscorthy CBS before later completing a Bachelor's degree in Business Studies and Accountancy at the Waterford Institute of Technology. He later worked as a sales rep for a number of medical companies and also spent some time as an analyst on RTÉ's the Sunday Game. In 2009, Ruth married Wexford camogie player Aoife O'Connor.

Honours

Player

Starlights
Wexford Senior Football Championship: 2002, 2004

Wexford
All-Ireland Senior Hurling Championship: 1996
Leinster Senior Hurling Championship: 1996, 2004
Leinster Under-21 Hurling Championship: 1996, 1997

Manager

Rapparees
Wexford Senior Hurling Championship: 2021

References

1976 births
Living people
Rapparees hurlers
Wexford inter-county hurlers
Wexford inter-county Gaelic footballers
Leinster inter-provincial hurlers
Hurling managers